Walter Hines Page Senior High School is a public high school in Greensboro, North Carolina commonly referred to as Page High School or simply Page.

History
Walter Hines Page Senior High School opened its doors in September, 1958, under the leadership of Principal Luther R. Medlin (formerly the principal of Central Junior High School). The school was named for Walter Hines Page, a North Carolina journalist, diplomat, supporter of education, and ambassador to Great Britain.

In 1967, Medlin, who had led the school through its developmental years, left Page to become President of Guilford Technical Institute (now Guilford Technical Community College). He was succeeded by Robert A. Newton, who was principal from 1967–70. Robert A. Clendenin, formerly the principal of Aycock Junior High School, became the third principal in 1970 and remained through 1991. Paul J. Puryear became the fourth principal of Page in the August 1991. Puryear attended Page as a student, served as an assistant principal for nine years, and returned to Page from a two-year term as principal of Athens Drive High School in Raleigh, North Carolina.

Between 1959 and 1965, Page produced two Morehead Scholars each year. A chapter of the National Honor Society was chartered during the 1958–59 school year.  From 1981 to 1982, Page's Cultural Arts Department was a national finalist for the coveted $10,000 Rockefeller Foundation Grant.

Athletics
Page teams, whose mascot is the pirate, have been State 4-A champions in football, boys' and girls' soccer, basketball, swimming, and boys' and girls' tennis. In 1982–83 Page was the recipient of the Wachovia Cup, and the News and Record Cup for the best overall winning percentage in varsity competition in the city and county. A rivalry exists between the athletic teams of Page and Grimsley Senior High School. The girls' tennis team won 4 state championships in a row from 2004–2007 and held an undefeated streak of over 80 matches. Page is now 4-AA with 1822 students. The 2009 Page High School Varsity Men's Soccer Team won the 4A State Championship. The 1980, 1983, 1985 & 2011 Page High School Varsity Football Team won the 4AA State Championship. The football players of the 1984 / 1985 State Champion football team were all inducted into the NC Football Hall Of Fame in 2010. Page High School won two State Championships in Wrestling 1969 and 1970. Page women's soccer were also state champions in 1986, 1987 and 1988 under the leadership of Coach Osbourne.

Music program
There are four band ensembles offered at Page. The basic ensemble is the non-audition based Concert Band. From Concert Band, students may continue into one or more of the three higher, audition-based groups: Symphonic Band, Wind Ensemble, or Jazz Band. The school also offers non-performance classes, which currently consist of IB Music, but has included AP Music Theory in the past. The school also has marching band, named the Page Marching Pirates. They perform at football games, and annually participate in local parades such as the Greensboro Holiday Parade.

Page High School has a String Orchestra. During a normal school year, there are two separate levels of string performance. Both levels perform four regular concerts throughout the year, playing together and on occasion with the Band or Choral groups.

Academics
Page Senior High School continues to win new academic honors regionally, statewide, and nationally in such areas as Mock Trial, Science Olympiad, High IQ, and Computer High IQ.  Page offers a number of Advanced Placement courses, as well as registering with the International Baccalaureate program in 2008. This option of two advanced-level class selections has given a boost to Page's academics and statistical performance, but has also led to curriculum and staff distribution issues which the school aims to rectify soon.

Theater
Page Senior High School's performers are known as the Page Playmakers. Page Senior High is Troupe #7253 of the International Thespian Society. The Page Playmakers usually follow a show schedule similar to this:
 Cabaret, a variety show of short skits, songs, and dances based around a central theme.
 A winter play. For the 2017–2018 season, the Playmakers will present "Crazytown" by Jonathan Rand, under the direction of Laura White. In 2018–2019, they performed “Alice in Wonderland.”
 A spring musical. For the 2017–2018 season, the Playmakers will present Broadway's "Footloose!: The Musical" in March 2018. In 2019, they performed “The Addams Family.”

Notable alumni
Michael Brooks (born 1967), NFL safety
Lamont Burns (born 1974), NFL offensive guard
Spencer Chamberlain (born 1983), lead vocalist for metalcore band Underoath
Brandon Copeland (born 1986), Arena football wide receiver
Todd Ellis (born 1967), football quarterback, radio broadcaster
Bryson Fonville (born 1994), professional basketball player
Jasmine Gill (born 1990), professional women's basketball player
Jeremy Harris (born 1996), professional basketball player
John Isner (born 1985), professional tennis player 
Haywood Jeffires (born 1964), All-Pro NFL wide receiver
Ken Jeong (born 1969), physician, comedian, and actor (Knocked Up, The Hangover and its sequels, television sitcoms Community and Dr. Ken)
Paris Kea (born 1996), WNBA player
Stan Lane (born 1953), retired professional wrestler
Javon Leake (born 1998), NFL running back
Rob Lovejoy (born 1991), MLS player
Danny Manning (born 1966), college basketball coach and NBA player
Eddie Robinson (born 1978), MLS player
Lee Rouson (born 1962), NFL running back and 2x Super Bowl champion with the New York Giants
Mo Spencer (born 1952), NFL defensive back
Whitney Way Thore (born 1984), American television personality
Barbara Weathers (born 1963), American Singer & Entertainer
Tripp Welborne (born 1968), NFL safety and punt returner

References

Public high schools in North Carolina
Schools in Greensboro, North Carolina
International Baccalaureate schools in North Carolina